Nathaniel George Clayton (1833-1895) was a British Conservative politician who served as MP for Hexham in 1892.

Clayton was first elected at the 1892 general election, and left parliament later that year.

References

External links 
 Hansard

1833 births
1895 deaths
UK MPs 1892–1895
People from Hexham
Conservative Party (UK) MPs for English constituencies